Hemant Mahaur (born 1976) is an Indian actor, director, writer, and producer, working predominantly in the Hindi cinema. He is also the Managing Director of Mask Magic Film & TV Institute Privet Limited (MMFTI). He is an acting instructor and has trained some Bollywood actors. He attended India's National School of Drama.

Childhood
Hemant Mahaur was born on 18 August 1976 in Agra, the city of the Taj Mahal in Uttar Pradesh in Northern India in a middle-class family. He began appearing on stage at the age of six when he took part in his school plays in Hatharas city in Uttar Pradesh. His interest in films was kindled right at an early age when as a toddler, his father, a retired class one central government officer from the Government of India, took him and his mother to watch Hindi films, almost every Sunday. Having grown up on the hardcore Hindi Masala movies  of the 1970–80s, it was but natural that one day as a child, he decided that he was going to take up acting as a profession.

Education
Hemant Mahaur is science graduate from the Meerut University, with specialisation in biology. During his college days he started working seriously under theater activists Panchanan Patak and Lalit Mohan Thapaliyal and did many plays as an actor during 1989 to 1994 in Delhi. He then shifted from biology into studying law. He enrolled himself into the LLB course, again from the Meerut University. Had he not got admission at the prestigious National School of Drama, in New Delhi, he would have been a lawyer.

Education in theater
Hemant Mahaur did a one-year diploma course in theater from the Sriram Center (SCR), New Delhi, in the year 1994-95. From 1995 to 1998, he undertook training at the National School of Drama, specialising in acting. (Source: NSD Site)

Theater experience
Hemant has more than 30 years of experience of working in theater. He has been working as a professional actor since 1989, when he was doing his college. Between 1989 and 1994 he did many plays as an actor, and performed in theater festivals like Nandikar theater festival in Calcutta, Ipta festival in Patna and in Jabalpur etc. In 1994, Hemant Mahaur did One year Acting diploma course from Sri Ram Center New Delhi. During his acting course in SRC, the professional wing of SRC, called Sri Ram Center Repertory company gave him a chance to participate as an actor in plays. There, he played some Hindi plays under theater directors like B.V.Karanth, Habeeb Tanveer, Ranjit Kapur and traveled with SRC Rep Co in various parts in India. And then in 1995, he got selected in prestigious World class institution N.S.D ( National School of Drama ), where he specialized in Acting. During 1995 to 1998, his training in N.S.D, he  did main roles throughout. After his training from the National School of Drama, he formed his own theater group and called it "Mask Magic". As "Mask Magic" is a pan-India registered organisation, it has been performing plays all over India.

Hemant Mahaur has worked with theater personalities like B. V. Karanth, Habib Tanvir, Satyadev Dube, Kanhayya Lal, Mohan Mahrishi, Ram Gopal Bajaj, D. R. Ankur, M. K. Raina, Kirti Jain, Anuradha Kapur, Bansi Kaul, Ranjit Kapur, Robin Das, Naseeruddin Shah, Pankaj Kapur, Tripurari Sharma, Dadi Padamji and Rita Ganguli.

He has also worked with international theater personalities Triplev Velentien from Ukraine, Morutz Orski from Poland and Sueveston from the United Kingdom.

Also, in 2014, Hemant Mahaur formed a film institute called MASK MAGIC FILM & TV INSTITUTE PVT LTD ( MMFTI ). He is running MMFTI as Managing Director in Mumbai.

Acting in films
 "The Warrior" (2001). (Bafta award-winning and Oscar nominated), directed by Asif Kapadia
 "Swaraj"The Little Republic' (won the Best Social Film Award at 2003 National Film Awards constituted by Government of India), directed by Anwar Jamal
 "Jungle" (2000 film), directed by Ram Gopal Varma
 "Shool" (1999 film), directed by E. Niwas
 "Chintu ji" (2009 film), directed by Ranjit Kapur
 "Arjun: The Worrier Prince" (2012 animated film; voice of Duryodana)
 "Chot" (2004 film) directed by Nabh Kumar Raju
"Agent Vinod" (2012 film)  Directed By Sri RamRaghwan
"Peter Gaya Kaam Se" (coming release)  Directed By John Owen
"Haal-E-Kangaal (released- only 2 character full length movie) Directed By Ram Chandran PN
 "Highway" (2014 film) Directed by Imtiaz Ali
 "Phantom" (2016 film) Directed By Kabir Khan
 "Yaara" (2020 film) Directed By Tigmanshu Dhulia
 "Apna Amitabh to super hit hai" (Coming release- as main lead), Directed by Ajay Anand.
 "The Great Indian Murder" (Disney+HotStar) Produce by Ajay Devgan Films, Directed by Tigmanshu Dhulia.
 "Dr.Arora"(Sonyliv) Produced by Imtiyaz Ali(Window seat films) Directed by Sajid Ali and Archit Kumar.

Acting in short filmsSadak Chhaap (New York film academy's short film) selected for screening in Cannes film festival 2015, Directed by Anvita SudarshanJang Hamne Bhi Ladi Thi, Lekin (SRFTI'S first Diploma film, Screened in Mumbai film festival), Directed by Manu GautamHotel 55 ( Asingle Actor film) Directed by Richard MelliniKabahun Na Chhaden Khet Directed by Vikram Jeet Singh Bullar

Direction
 DWAND in 2019
 THE KITE in 2011.

Writing in films
 Hemant wrote dialogue for Hindi film CHILAM Story, screenplay and dialogue for the short film THE KITE Story, screen play and dialogue for Mayanagari''

References

External links

People from Agra
Indian male film actors
Male actors in Hindi cinema
Living people
1970 births
National School of Drama alumni